Science in the Soul: Selected Writings of a Passionate Rationalist is a book of selected essays and other writings by Richard Dawkins published in 2017.

Published after two volumes of autobiography, it is his second essay collection, together with A Devil's Chaplain (2003).

Description 

The book was edited by  Gillian Somerscales and dedicated to Christopher Hitchens (1949-2011).

It contains more than forty essays, journalism, lectures and letters (organised in eight chapters) about the importance of science.

Reviews 

Michael Shermer, editor-in-chief of Skeptic, wrote that "No living scientist is more deserving of such recognition than Richard Dawkins, whose every book reflects his literary genius and scientific substance. Science in the Soul is the perfect embodiment of Nobel-quality literature."

James Randi, author of The Faith Healers, wrote that "Science in the Soul is packed with Dr Dawkins’s philosophy, humor, anger, and quiet wisdom, leading the reader gently but firmly to inevitable conclusions that edify and educate, while dropping in periodic bons mots that seize attention rather firmly."

References

External links 

2017 non-fiction books
Books by Richard Dawkins
Books critical of religion
English-language books
English non-fiction books
Essay collections
Bantam Press books